Special Forces Group (SFG) is an Australian Army formation command that forms part of the Special Operations Command (SOCOMD). The group is a brigade-level formation that commands all of the units assigned to Special Operations Command. The Special Forces Group reports to the Special Operations Command.

In October 2015, the Chief of Army's Senior Advisory Committee (CASAC) recommended as part of a review of SOCOMD that a formation command be established within SOCOMD responsible for the command and control of SOCOMD units. The Special Forces Group was subsequently established in December 2015.

Brigadier Craig Shortt was appointed Commander Special Forces Group (COMO SFG) in December 2018.

Structure

As of 2020, the Special Forces Group comprised the following units:
Headquarters, Special Forces Group
 Special Air Service Regiment (Campbell Barracks, WA)
 1st Commando Regiment (HQ at Randwick Barracks, NSW)
 2nd Commando Regiment (Holsworthy Barracks, NSW)
 Special Operations Engineer Regiment (Holsworthy Barracks, NSW)
 Special Operations Logistics Squadron (Banksmeadow, NSW)
 Special Operations Training & Education Centre (SOTEC) (Lone Pine Barracks, NSW)
 Australian Defence Force School of Special Operations (Holsworthy, NSW)
 Australian Defence Force Parachuting School (HMAS Albatross, NSW)

The Special Forces Group is supported by the 6th Aviation Regiment from the 16th Aviation Brigade. The 6th Aviation Regiment is under the operational command of SOCOMD for "directed special operations tasking".

References
Citations

Bibliography

Special forces of Australia
Brigades of Australia